The European Regions (ER) was a parliamentary group in the National Assembly of Serbia. The group was composed of the Party of Democratic Action of Sandžak (SDA S), Democratic Alliance of Croats in Vojvodina (DSHV), Party for Democratic Action (PVD), and Together for Vojvodina (ZZV).

History 
The parliamentary group was formed by deputies of national minority parties at the first session of the 13th National Assembly. Aleksandar Olenik from ZZV became the leader of the group, Enis Imamović from SDA S became the deputy. On 23 October, it was announced that Tomislav Žigmanov, the leader of the Democratic Alliance of Croats in Vojvodina (DSHV), will be appointed minister of human and minority rights and social dialogue, with Žigmanov adding that the European Regions parliamentary group will be supportive of Aleksandar Vučić. This led to Olenik's announcement that ZZV would terminate its coalition with DSHV, but it would remain in the parliamentary group. Žigmanov resigned as a member of parliament on 25 October 2022, which led to the dissolution of the parliamentary group; Žigmanov was replaced by Mirko Ostrogonac a day later.

Composition 
This table shows the parties whose deputies sat in this parliamentary group.

References 

Political parties established in 2022
2022 establishments in Serbia
Parliamentary groups
Defunct political party alliances in Serbia
2022 disestablishments in Serbia
Political parties disestablished in 2022